Woolf is a masculine given name which may refer to:

 Woolf Barnato (1895–1948), British financier and racing driver
 Woolf Fisher (1912–1975), New Zealand businessman and philanthropist
 Woolf Steinberg (1925–1996), birth name of English actor Woolf Morris
 Woolf Wess (1861–1946), Anglo-Jewish anarchist, trade union organizer and newspaper editor

See also
 Wolf (name)

Masculine given names